Gyllene Tider ("Golden Times") is a Swedish pop group fronted by Roxette singer, guitarist and songwriter Per Gessle. They were one of the best-selling Swedish bands ever and have had numerous hits in Scandinavia, starting with the break-through song "Flickorna på TV2" in 1980. The band earned legendary status in Sweden based on their power pop, catchy choruses and lyrics about life in a small town.

History
In 1976, Per Gessle met Mats Persson, a member of the band Audiovisuellt Angrepp, forming the duo "Grape Rock". Later Micke Syd Andersson, Anders Herrlin and Göran Fritzon joined and the quintet was born. The group's name was changed to "Gyllene Tider", alluding to Mott the Hoople's song "The Golden Age of Rock 'n' Roll".  In 1980, the LP Gyllene Tider was released, becoming a huge success in Sweden. "Flickorna på TV2" ("The girls on TV2") was the album's biggest hit.

The second album, released in 1981 under the name Moderna Tider (Modern Times), also enjoyed huge success, and was followed by a record-breaking national tour. The following year Puls (Pulse) was released, including the hits "Sommartider" ("Summer times") and "Flickan i en Cole-Porter-sång" ("The girl in a Cole Porter song"). In March 1985 Gyllene Tider officially broke up after releasing their only album in English; "The Heartland Cafe'". Per Gessle continued with a solo-career and formed Roxette with Marie Fredriksson in 1986.

After the break-up several platinum-selling compilation albums were released and a number of live reunions have taken place, starting with the immensely popular Återtåget tour in 1996. In 2004, the band celebrated its twenty-fifth anniversary with the first new album in over 20 years and a huge summer tour in July and August. The tour, called GT25, was a massive success, being the biggest tour in Scandinavia ever and the second largest of all time in the whole of Europe, gathering well over half a million people all over Sweden. When they performed at Ullevi stadium in Gothenburg on 7 August 2004 during the GT25, 58,984 fans watched the concert live, breaking the record set by Bruce Springsteen, and the performance was later broadcast on TV4.

Gyllene Tider reunited again on 14 August 2010 as a surprise encore during Roxette's  concert in Halmstad, both bands' hometown. They performed a three-song set, featuring the songs "Juni, Juli, Augusti", "Sommartider", and "När alla vännerna gått hem", with Marie Fredriksson and the rest of the Roxette band joining them on stage for the last number. In January 2013, the group announced a new album and summer tour in Sweden, both called "Dags att tänka på refrängen". The album was released on 24 April 2013; the 19-show sell-out tour started on 5 July 2013 in Halmstad and ended on 10 August in Halmstad.

In January 2019, Gyllene Tider announced a farewell tour to celebrate 40 years which took place in Sweden and Norway in the summer of 2019. The tour started on 4 July in Halmstad, Sweden, and ended there on 10 August as well.

Their final album Samma skrot och korn was released on 14 June 2019.

Discography

Albums

Studio albums

Others
Modern Times (1982) - Never released
Heartland (special US release, containing 6 tracks from The Heartland Café. (Release credited to Roxette)

Live albums

Compilation albums

EPs
1978 Gyllene Tider (EP) (aka "Billy" and "the yellow EP")
1981 Swing&Sweet (Bonus-EP) included with the first copies of the album Moderna Tider with four cover versions of international hits: Gyllene tider för rock 'n' roll (Golden Age of Rock'n'Roll - Mott the Hoople), Vill ha ett svar (I Need to Know - Tom Petty), Och jorden den är rund (And Your Bird Can Sing - The Beatles) and Ge mig inte det där (Girl Don't Tell Me - The Beach Boys).

DVD and VHS
1997 Återtåget (documentary from TV4, live and interviews )
2004 Karaoke Hits!
2004 Parkliv! <small>(concert/documentary from 1981 filmed by Lasse Hallström, released on DVD 2004)</small>
2004 GT25 Live! (live at Ullevi 2004)
2013 Live sommaren 2013 
2019 GT40 Live Ullevi'' (live at Ullevi 2019) (Also on BD).

Singles

Notes

References

External links

 Gyllene Tider(Official) 
 Gyllene Tider.com - Elektroniska Tider  (With full discography and info)
 
 

Musical groups established in 1977
Musical groups disestablished in 1985
Per Gessle
Swedish pop music groups
1977 establishments in Sweden
1985 disestablishments in Sweden
Culture in Halmstad